Sheikha Fariha Al-Ahmad Al-Jaber Al-Sabah (15 February 1944 – 12 August 2018) was a Kuwaiti royal, one of the daughters of the tenth ruler of Kuwait, Sheikh Ahmad Al-Jaber Al-Sabah. She was born in the Dasman Palace on 15 February 1944. She undertook several charitable activities, heading the "Kuwait Association for the Ideal Family", which created the "Ideal Mother Competition" in 2004 and worked to protect the youth and the disabled. Frayha also encouraged and supported politics that empowered Kuwaiti women.

She received an honorary doctorate from the American College of Greece in 2008. Married to her cousin Sheikh Rashid Al-Hamoud Al-Jaber Al-Sabah (1942–2011), Secretary of the Council of the Ruling Family. They had four children together: Sheikha Reema, Sheikh Hamoud, Sheikha Bibi and Sheikh Ahmed.

She died on 12 August 2018 in Egypt.

Patronages 
 Chairman of the Supreme Committee of Ideal Mothers for Special Families (2004).

Honours 
  Commander of the National Order of the Cedar (Beirut, 8 November 2007).

References

1944 births
2018 deaths
House of Al-Sabah
Kuwaiti women
People from Kuwait City
Commanders of the National Order of the Cedar
Daughters of monarchs